Ecurie Maarsbergen  (French for Stable Maarsbergen) was a name used by Dutch racing driver Carel Godin de Beaufort to enter his own cars in Formula One and sports car racing between 1957 and 1964.Commonly the vehicles were entered for de Beaufort himself, but he also provided cars for a number of other drivers during the period.

Formula One

Sports car racing

Complete Formula One World Championship results
(key)

 indicates a race entered with an F2 car.

References

Formula One entrants
Dutch auto racing teams
Auto racing teams established in 1957
Auto racing teams disestablished in 1964
24 Hours of Le Mans teams